Reading services comprises a pair of adjacent motorway service areas on the M4 motorway to the south of the town of Reading in the English county of Berkshire. The two areas are on opposite sides of the motorway, with Reading West services serving westbound traffic and Reading East services serving eastbound traffic. 

Reading services are operated by Moto. Co-located with each of the two service areas is a Travelodge budget hotel.

The services are within the civil parish of Burghfield. There is no direct vehicular or pedestrian link between the two service areas, whilst each area has its own access to the local road network that is gated and restricted to authorised vehicles.

References

Further reading

External links 

Moto official website — Reading East
Moto official website — Reading West
Motorway Services Online — Reading

Transport infrastructure completed in 1993
M4 motorway service stations
Buildings and structures in Berkshire
Moto motorway service stations
Services
Transport in Berkshire
Burghfield